Puget is a surname, and may refer to:

 André Puget (1911-1973), joint chief executive from 1962-67 of the Concorde project
 Hilarion Paul Puget de Barbantane (1754–1828), French general of the French Revolutionary Wars
 Jade Puget (born 1973), guitarist for the alternative rock band AFI
 Jean-Loup Puget (born 1947), French astrophysicist
 Peter Puget (1765–1822), officer in the Royal Navy, known for his exploration of Puget Sound
 Pierre Paul Puget (1620–1694),  French painter, sculptor, architect and engineer

See also
 Puget, Vaucluse department, France
 Puget-sur-Argens, Var department, France
 Puget-Ville, Var department, France
 Puget Sound, Washington state
 Puget Island, Washington state